Parkgate is a suburb of Rotherham, South Yorkshire, England. It has since been consumed by its neighbour, Rawmarsh and is in the ward of Rawmarsh from which it has been indistinguishable since the early 20th century.

Toponymy 
Its name is said to originate from its location at the end point of the parkland of Wentworth Woodhouse. Although it marks the old entry gates of the parkland, the Wentworth estate stretched far past it, encompassing 90,000 acres of what was beautiful English countryside. The area gives its name to the Parkgate Seam, important in the South Yorkshire Coalfield.

Economy 
Parkgate is near the location of the Park Gate Iron and Steel Company.

It is also home to the Parkgate Shopping Outlet.

Transport

Roads 
The A633 runs through Parkgate.

Rail 
The area was served by Parkgate and Rawmarsh railway station, originally named Rawmarsh which was situated in Parkgate, adjacent to the Park Gate Iron and Steel Company's works. It was constructed by the North Midland Railway and opened in 1840. The station was closed on 1 January 1968.

The area was also served by Parkgate and Aldwarke railway station which was opened in July 1873 by the Manchester, Sheffield and Lincolnshire Railway company. The station was originally known as "Aldwarke". The station was closed to passengers on 29 October 1951.

The nearest rail station now is Rotherham Central.

Tram-train 
 
In August 2008 plans were announced for an extension to Sheffield Supertram to Rotherham Central station. In September 2009 it was decided that the extension would terminate at Parkgate Shopping Centre. The proposed route was to have been in operation by 2015, extended  to May 2018, eventually opening on 25 October 2018, only to be temporarily closed after a collision with a lorry on the first day of service. The motive power is a fleet of seven Vossloh Citylink Class 399 tram-trains which are specially equipped to operate on both tram and mainline railways, with a service frequency of three trains per hour.

Canals 

The Greasbrough Canal, also known as Earl Fitzwilliam's Canal joins the River Don Navigation at Parkgate. Both are part of the Sheffield and South Yorkshire Navigation.

Cultural references 
Parkgate pumping station is a Newcomen engine house, built circa 1823. The building is intact and houses an electric pump.

Parkgate and Rawmarsh railway station and the adjoining steel works, together with other locations in the Rotherham area, were featured in the 1958 film Tread Softly Stranger starring Diana Dors. Diana Dors's co-star George Baker is seen arriving at platform 1 of "Rawborough" station.

Sport 
There is a football club, Parkgate F.C., based in the suburb, and the defunct clubs Parkgate & Rawmarsh United, Parkgate Works Sports and Parkgate Welfare F.C. was also prominent.

References

Geography of Rotherham